Halton Borough Council is the local authority for the Borough of Halton, incorporating the towns of Runcorn and Widnes and the parishes of Daresbury, Hale, Moore and Preston Brook. It is a constituent council of Liverpool City Region Combined Authority.

History

Although Halton dates back to the 12th century when land on both sides of the River Mersey belonged to the Barony of Halton, the origin of the district council was the outcome of the Local Government Commission's 1969 Redcliffe-Maud Report. This proposed to create metropolitan counties containing metropolitan district councils in the most urbanised parts of England. The model was that of the London Boroughs and Greater London Council formed in 1965. Southern Lancashire and northern Cheshire were among these urban areas, and two new metropolitan counties were to be formed around Liverpool (as Merseyside) and Manchester (as Greater Manchester).  However, the towns of Widnes and Runcorn (and the County Borough of Warrington) which lay between these were reluctant to join either. The Commission agreed that Halton and Warrington would become districts within Cheshire, as they would be detached from Lancashire by the two new metropolitan counties controlling the territory to the north.

The district was formally established on 1 April 1974 from Runcorn Urban District and part of Runcorn Rural District from Cheshire, and the Borough of Widnes and the parish of Hale from Whiston Rural District in Lancashire. On 1 April 1998, Halton became an independent unitary authority, though it is still served by Cheshire Police and Cheshire Fire and Rescue Service, and forms part of Cheshire for ceremonial purposes, such as the Lord Lieutenancy.

On 1 April 2014, Halton became part of the Liverpool City Region Combined Authority, joining the local authorities of Liverpool, Sefton, Wirral, Knowsley and St Helens, the five metropolitan district councils which constitute the county of Merseyside. This effectively reverses the position adopted in the 1970s which created it as an anomaly. As a unitary authority its status is similar to the metropolitan district councils.

Political control

Elections to the council are by thirds. This means that a third of the 54 councillors are elected every year over a four-year cycle (with no elections in the fourth year). Elections are usually held on the first Thursday in May.

Since the creation of the council in 1974, political control of the council has been held by the following parties:

Arms

References

Borough of Halton
Leader and cabinet executives
Unitary authority councils of England
Local education authorities in England
Local authorities in Cheshire
Billing authorities in England
Liverpool City Region
1974 establishments in England